De noche pero sin sueño is a Mexican late-night talk show hosted by the comedian Adrián Uribe. The series was announced at TelevisaUnivision's upfront for the 2022–2023 television season. The hour-long program premiered first on Univision on 9 October 2022. In Mexico, the program premiered on Las Estrellas on 10 October 2022.

On 11 December 2022, the series was renewed for a second season which is set to premiere on 18 March 2023.

Format 
The show features a mix of interviews, comedy sketches, musical performances, and entertainment segments. The show's house band is led by Venezuelan model and television host Patricia Zavala.

Episodes

Series overview

Season 1 (2022)

Ratings

U.S. viewers 
 

| link2             = #Season 2 (2023)
| episodes2         = 
| start2            = 
| end2              = 
| startrating2      = 
| endrating2        = 
| viewers2          = 
}}

Mexico viewers 
 

| timeslot2         = Saturday 11:00pm
| link2             = #Season 2 (2023)
| episodes2         = 
| start2            = 
| end2              = 
| startrating2      = 
| endrating2        = 
| viewers2          = 
}}

Notes

References 

2022 Mexican television series debuts
Mexican television talk shows
Las Estrellas original programming
Television series by Televisa
Spanish-language television shows